Janice Robinson (born 8 December 1967) is an American singer and songwriter, initially known as a member of 1990s Italian Eurodance group Livin' Joy before she embarked on a solo career.

Early life and career
Robinson, raised in Garfield, New Jersey, toured as the vocalist for euro-dance group Snap! in 1990-91, replacing studio vocalist Penny Ford in the group’s live shows. Robinson gained worldwide success in the early to mid-1990s with the Italian house group Livin' Joy as the lead singer before going solo in 1999. After Robinson left, Livin' Joy scored more hits during the 1995–1996 period with singer Tameko Star. However, the biggest remains "Dreamer", an international hit reaching number 1 in the UK and the top 10 in many other European countries. Robinson had previously worked with the Livin' Joy producers on two singles, "Children" and "Sweetest Day of May". On Livin' Joy's Don't Stop Movin, her vocals do not appear on any tracklisted songs, until the original "Dreamer" appears as a hidden track at the very end. Her subsequent solo debut album The Color Within Me was an earthy, more pop styled album and was released in 1999 to largely favorable reviews, scoring a minor pop hit with the single "Nothing I Would Change". In 2000, Robinson performed on the drama Charmed, in the episode "Animal Pragmatism".

In 2000, she toured America as an opening act for Tina Turner's U.S. leg of her world tour. Robinson's biggest hit with Livin' Joy was reissued with new production, and new vocals and Robinson was credited for her work on it this time. "Dreamer '05" became a hit making the top five of the Hot Dance Music/Club Play chart. Her dance single, "Earthbeat" is featured on the compilation Pride 1998, mixed and produced by Julian Marsh. Robinson took a long hiatus and had two daughters and to care for her ill parents.

In 2015, Robinson released "There Must Be Love" in collaboration with David Morales; the track was well received, particularly in Italy, and reached the Billboard Dance Charts. In 2017, she released the single "Father".

In 2018, Robinson returned to the stage on The X Factor UK as a contestant surprising the judging panel with the revelation that she was the voice and songwriter behind the international dance track "Dreamer". She successfully made it to the live shows as part of the Over 28s category mentored by Ayda Field and finished in 14th place.

In 2019, Robinson spent the spring and summer touring the UK and abroad. On August 1, she released a new single titled "Freedom", teaming up with DJ David Morales once again.

In 2021, Robinson continued working on a documentary about her life, alongside performing across the UK and abroad. 

In 2022, Robinson announced that she was continuing to work on her documentary about her life story. On 8 January, she announced on BBC Radio 2 that new music is in the works. The first single called "Essex Girls" with British rappers who used the verse of "Dreamer" was released in January on Warner Records and a brand new new version of "Dreamer" was released in February 2022 with DJ Salvatore Lodato on Spinnin Records. Robinson said she was "excited to reach a whole new generation" of fans who love her music. She also released "Love Comes Once in Your Life" with OMG Collective.

Songwriting discography
Abigail - Home...Again
11. "Let the Joy Rise"

Ashley Tisdale - Headstrong 
14. "Suddenly"

Brahim - Evolution 
02. "So into You"

 Hania Stach
00. "Regroup"

Kristine W - Stronger 
09. "Let Love Reign"

Lucas Prata - Let's Get It On 
04. "Love of My Life"
13. "Feel the Love Again"

Natalia - Back For More 
02. "Risin"

 Reina - This Is Reina 
01. "If I Close My Eyes"
05. "On My Own"

Ricki-Lee Coulter - Brand New Day 
03. "Melody of Life"
12. "I Appreciate You"

Sandrine Van Handenhoven - Story of Us (Movie) 
00. "Story of Us"

Taylor Dayne - Satisfied 
09. "Crash"

Taylor Dayne - Naked without You 
02. "Whenever You Fall"

Tevin Campbell - Tevin Campbell 
02. "Never Again"

 VFactory - These Are the Days EP
03. "These Are the Days"

Singles

Other singles

See also
List of artists who reached number one on the US Dance chart

References

External links
Janice Robinson at Myspace
Janice Robinson at Twitter
Janice Robinson at Instagram

1965 births
Living people
20th-century African-American women singers
American women singer-songwriters
Singer-songwriters from New Jersey
People from Garfield, New Jersey
American women pop singers
American contemporary R&B singers
American soul musicians
American expatriates in Italy
The X Factor (British TV series) contestants
African-American songwriters
21st-century African-American people
21st-century African-American women